Wolfgang Schwarz (born February 12, 1952) is a football manager and retired Austrian football forward.

External links
 

1952 births
Living people
Austrian footballers
Austrian football managers
FC Red Bull Salzburg players
FC Wacker Innsbruck players
Sparta Rotterdam players
SC Austria Lustenau managers
Association football forwards
WSG Tirol managers
Austrian expatriate sportspeople in the Netherlands
FC Tirol Innsbruck managers
Expatriate footballers in the Netherlands
Sportspeople from Innsbruck
Footballers from Tyrol (state)
Austrian expatriate footballers